The 2021 FIFA Beach Soccer World Cup qualifiers for UEFA was a beach soccer tournament contested by European men's national teams who are members of UEFA that determined the four nations from Europe that qualified to the 2021 FIFA Beach Soccer World Cup in Russia.

The event, organised by Beach Soccer Worldwide (BSWW), took place in Nazaré, Portugal from 17–27 June 2021.

The tournament was a multi-stage competition, consisting of a first group stage, second group stage, knockout stage and placement matches.

Russia were the defending champions but did not enter this year's competition, having already qualified for the World Cup as hosts. The tournament was won by Spain, who, along with Ukraine, Portugal and Belarus earned qualification to the World Cup by finishing in the top four positions; Ukraine subsequently withdrew from the World Cup before it began and were replaced by Switzerland.

Format
The competition format was as follows:

The tournament started with a round-robin group stage; the lowest ranked ten teams entered at this point. Five nations, the group winners and best runners-up, advanced to the next round.

There was then a second round-robin group stage; the highest ranked 11 teams entered at this point. Plus the five qualifiers from the first group stage, a total of 16 teams competed during this round. The top two teams of each group (total of eight nations), advanced to the knockout stage.

The knockout stage began with the quarter-finals and ended with the final. The four winners of the quarter-final ties secured qualification to the World Cup; they also progressed to the semi-finals to continue to contest the tournament title.

The nations not advancing from the second group stage played in consolation matches to decide ninth through sixteenth place; the nations not advancing from the quarter-finals played in consolation matches to decide fifth through eighth place.

Teams
21 teams entered the competition:

Entered at the first group stage

1

Entered at the second group stage

Notes:
1. First appearance

Draw
The draws for both the first and second group stages took place at 12:00 CEST on 4 June, at Beach Soccer Worldwide's headquarters in Barcelona, Spain. It's procedure was as follows:

First group stage

The ten teams entering the first group stage were drawn into two groups of three and one group of four. Firstly, the three highest ranked teams were seeded and one each automatically assigned to the head of one of the groups. The remaining seven teams were split into two pots of three and one pot of one, with the highest ranked teams placed in Pot 1 through to the lowest ranked placed in Pot 3.

From Pot 1, the first team drawn out was placed into Group A, second into B and third into C; they were allocated to position 2 in their respective groups. The teams from Pot 2 were drawn in the same manner; they were allocated to position 3 in their respective groups. The solo team in Pot 3 was drawn alongside a lot from an additional pot containing three lots marked with one of the names of the three groups, to determine which group it would be randomly placed in; it was allocated to position 4 in that group.

The composition of the seeds and pots is shown below:

Second group stage

The sixteen teams competing in the second group stage were drawn into four groups of four. Firstly, the four highest ranked teams of the 11 entering at this stage were seeded and one each automatically assigned to the head of one of the groups. The remaining seven teams entering at this stage plus the then unknown best qualifier from the first group stage were split into two pots of four, with the highest ranked teams placed in Pot 1 and the lowest ranked placed in Pot 2.

From Pot 1, the first team drawn out was placed into Group A, second into B and so on; they were allocated to position 2 in their respective groups. The teams from Pot 2 were drawn in the same manner; they were allocated to position 3 in their respective groups.

The composition of the seeds and pots is shown below:

First group stage
Each team earns three points for a win in regulation time, two points for a win in extra time, one point for a win in a penalty shoot-out, and no points for a defeat.

All times are local, WEST (UTC+1). Kickoff times shown were those scheduled; actual times may have differed slightly.

Group A

Group B

Group C

Ranking of second-placed teams
Since Groups A and C consisted of just three teams, for the third placed team from Group B, their result against the team finishing in fourth place in their group was discounted for this ranking.

Second group stage
As per the regulations of the second group stage draw, the statistically best qualifier from the first group stage was automatically allocated to position B3; this was Denmark.

The other four qualifiers (Estonia, Kazakhstan, Norway and Romania) were placed into the groups via a draw, made after the conclusion of the first group stage. All four teams were placed in one pot. The first team drawn out was placed into Group A, second into B and so on; they were allocated to position 4 in their respective groups. 20 June was allocated as a rest day.

Group A

Group B

Group C

Group D

13th–16th place play-offs
The teams finishing in fourth place in the groups of the second group stage faced each other in consolation matches to determine 13th through 16th place in the final standings.

Semi-finals

15th place match

13th place match

9th–12th place play-offs
The teams finishing in third place in the groups of the second group stage faced each other in consolation matches to determine 9th through 12th place in the final standings.

Semi-finals

11th place match

9th place match

Knockout stage
June 24 is allocated as a rest day for the teams progressing to the knockout stage.

The draw for the quarter-finals was made on 19 June, before the second group stage commenced. Placeholders for the eight teams were split into two pots: Pot 1, containing placeholders for the group winners, and Pot 2, containing placeholders for the runners-up. For each tie, a team from Pot 1 was drawn against a team from Pot 2. The fixtures were allocated to the bracket from top to bottom in the order they were drawn.

Quarter-finals
Winners qualify for 2021 FIFA Beach Soccer World Cup.

Semi-finals

5th–8th place

1st–4th place

Finals

7th place match

5th place match

3rd place match

Final

Awards

Winners

Individual awards
The following awards were given at the conclusion of the tournament.

Final standings

Qualified teams to the FIFA Beach Soccer World Cup
The following five teams from UEFA qualify for the 2021 FIFA Beach Soccer World Cup.

1 Bold indicates champions for that year. Italic indicates hosts for that year.

Notes

References

External links

First group stage
Second group stage & onwards

European qualifiers for the 2021 World Cup, at BS Russia (in Russian)

2021 in Portuguese sport
Uefa
International association football competitions hosted by Portugal
2021
2021 in beach soccer
June 2021 sports events in Portugal